Usseaux is a comune (municipality) in the Metropolitan City of Turin in the Italian region Piedmont, located about 50 km west of Turin.

Usseaux borders the following municipalities: Exilles, Chiomonte, Gravere, Meana di Susa, Pragelato, and Fenestrelle.

References

External links
 Official website

Cities and towns in Piedmont